Karem Arshid (born 24 January 1995) is an Israeli professional footballer who plays as a forward for Israeli Premier League club Hapoel Acre.

Career
On 7 June 2022 signed for Hapoel Acre.

References

1995 births
Living people
Israeli footballers
Arab-Israeli footballers
Hapoel Ra'anana A.F.C. players
Hapoel Afula F.C. players
Hapoel Hadera F.C. players
Sektzia Ness Ziona F.C. players
Hapoel Acre F.C. players
Maccabi Bnei Reineh F.C. players
Israeli Premier League players
Liga Leumit players
Footballers from Jadeidi-Makr
Association football forwards